The cinema of São Tomé and Príncipe does not have an extensive history, since São Tomé and Príncipe is not a large island. However there has been some filmmaking.

Colonial filmmaking
Colonial filmmakers shot ethnographic documentaries in São Tomé and Príncipe: Ernesto de Albuquerque shot A cultura do Cacau em Sao Tome in 1909, and Cardoso Furtado shot Serviçal e Senhor in 1910.

Contemporary filmmaking
The only feature film from São Tomé and Príncipe so far is A frutinha do Equador [Little Fruit from the Equator], a 1998 coproduction between Austria, Germany and São Tomé and Príncipe. Directed by Herbert Brodl, with São Tomé actors, the film combines fairy story, documentary, road movie and comedy.

Documentaries set in the island include:
 Extra Bitter: The Legacy of the Chocolate Islands, 2000 documentary by Derek Vertongen
 Sao Tome, cent-pour-pent cacao, 2004 documentary by Virginie Berda 
 Mionga ki Ôbo, 2005 documentary by Ângelo Torres
 The Lost Wave, 2007 surf documentary by Sam George

References